The King George V Memorial Hospital for Mothers and Babies is a former hospital, exclusively for mothers and babies, in Sydney, Australia. It is located on Missenden Road in Camperdown, directly opposite the main buildings of the much larger Royal Prince Alfred Hospital with which it was amalgamated on 14 November 2002.

History
King George V hospital, opened in 1941, was designed in the Inter-War International Art Moderne style by prominent Sydney architects Stephenson & Turner. Of an especially innovative design, the building was awarded the Sulman Award for Public Architecture by the Royal Australian Institute of Architects (NSW Chapter) in 1941. The building includes murals made by Danish sculptor Otto Steen and three statues by Hungarian sculptor Andor Mészáros: "Statue to Maternity", unveiled in 1944, "Surgeon" in 1945, and the final statue, of King George V, was unveiled in 1947.

The Hospital was named after King George V and was originally built as part of an expansion of the Royal Prince Alfred Hospital to be a stand-alone teaching hospital for obstetrics and gynaecology.

After serving in its intended role for 61 years the old King George V Memorial Hospital was, in 2002, amalgamated back into the (much larger) Royal Prince Alfred Hospital from which it had been separated in 1941. Maternity services were transferred into a larger newly built wing on the other side of Missenden Road and the original building was refurbished to house hospital administration offices for Royal Prince Alfred, including Human Resources and Staff related services.

References

Former hospitals in Sydney
Defunct hospitals in Australia
Hospital buildings completed in 1941
Hospitals established in 1941
1941 establishments in Australia
Hospitals disestablished in 2002
2002 disestablishments in Australia
Streamline Moderne architecture in Australia
Art Deco architecture in Sydney